The Fokker F.XX was a 1930s Dutch three-engined airliner designed and built by Fokker. It was the first Fokker design to use an elliptical-section fuselage instead of the traditional square fuselage and the first Fokker aircraft with retractable landing gear.

Development
The F.XX was a high-wing thick-section cantilever monoplane with a retractable tailwheel landing gear. It was powered by three Wright Cyclone radial engines, one in the nose and one under each wing on struts. The main landing gear retracted into the engine nacelles. The F.XX registered PH-AIZ and named Zilvermeeuw (en: Silver Gull) first flew in 1933. It was delivered to KLM for services from Amsterdam to London and Berlin. Although the F.XX was a more advanced design both in aerodynamics and looks than earlier Fokkers, the arrival of the twin-engined low-wing Douglas DC-2 and DC-3 soon rendered it obsolete. Only one aircraft was built, and after service with KLM was sold to French airline Air Tropique; the plane got a camouflage paint scheme and was registered F-APEZ. Air Tropique had ties with the Spanish Republican government, that used the plane to operate a liaison service between Madrid and Paris. In 1937 it went to LAPE in Spain, and was registered EC-45-E. The plane crashed in Spain February 15, 1938 near Barcelona at Prat de Llobregat Airport.

Licence production in the UK as the Airspeed AS.21 was not proceeded with.

Operators

KLM

Líneas Aéreas Postales Españolas (LAPE) 
Spanish Republican Air Force

Specifications (F.XX)

References

Bibliography

 The Illustrated Encyclopedia of Aircraft (Part Work 1982-1985), 1985, Orbis Publishing, Page 1895

External links
 "The Fokker F.XX". Flight, 5 October 1933, pp. 993–995.

1930s Dutch airliners
F 20
Abandoned civil aircraft projects
Trimotors
High-wing aircraft
Aircraft first flown in 1933